Morteza Farshbaf (Persian: مرتضی فرشباف, born 1986) is an Iranian film director and screenwriter. He earned a Crystal Simorgh nomination for Best Director for Tooman (2020).

Filmography

Film

Documentary

Awards and nominations

References

External links 

 

Iranian film directors
Iranian screenwriters
People from Gonbad-e Qabus
Living people
1986 births